The Skymaster Excel is an American powered parachute that was designed and produced by Skymaster Powered Parachutes of Hartland, Wisconsin. Now out of production, when it was available the aircraft was supplied as a kit for amateur construction.

The aircraft was introduced in 2001 and production ended when the company went out of business in late 2008.

Design and development
It features a  parachute-style wing, two-seats-in-tandem accommodation, tricycle landing gear and a single  Hirth 2706 engine in pusher configuration. The  Rotax 582 engine was also offered.

The aircraft carriage is built from bolted aluminium tubing. In flight steering is accomplished via foot pedals that actuate the canopy brakes, creating roll and yaw. On the ground the aircraft has lever-controlled nosewheel steering. The main landing gear incorporates spring rod suspension.

Operational history
In August 2015 ten examples were registered in the United States with the Federal Aviation Administration.

The design won many awards, including 2001 Sun 'n Fun Grand Champion, 2001 AirVenture Oshkosh Flex-wing Champion, 2002 AirVenture Oshkosh Flex-wing Champion, 2003 AirVenture Oshkosh Flex-wing Champion, 2003 Sun 'n Fun Innovations and 2004 Sun 'n Fun Best Trike. It was later developed into a smaller single seat design, the Skymaster Single Seater.

Specifications (version)

References

External links
Company website archives on Archive.org

Excel
2000s United States sport aircraft
2000s United States ultralight aircraft
Single-engined pusher aircraft
Powered parachutes
Homebuilt aircraft